Scythia or Scythica, also known as Pontic Scythia, was a kingdom created by the Scythians during the 6th to 3rd centuries BC in the Pontic–Caspian steppe.

The Pontic Scythian kingdom was formed as a result of the migration of the Scythians, an ancient Iranic people, from Central Asia into the Caucasian Steppe during the 9th to 8th centuries BC, after which the Scythians conquered the Pontic Steppe during the 8th to 7th centuries BC, with their Pontic possessions being an extension of their kingdom of the steppes.

After a period of successful expansion into West Asia during the 7th to 6th centuries BC, the Scythians were expelled from this region by the Medes, after which they retreated into the Pontic Steppe and consolidated into the Pontic Scythian kingdom during the 6th century BC.

The Pontic Scythian kingdom established complex contacts with the various populations of western Eurasia such as the Greeks and the Thracians, and it lasted until the 3rd century BC, when a related Iranic people, the Sarmatians, conquered much of the Pontic Steppe.

After this, the final Scythian polities became restricted to Crimea and Dobruja, where they would be eventually assimilated by the Roman Empire, Sarmatians, Goths, Huns, and Early Slavs over the course of the 1st to 6th centuries AD, after which the Scythians disappear from history.

History

Background

Origins of the Scythians
The Scythians originated in Central Asia possibly around the 9th century BC, and they arrived in the Caucasian Steppe in the 8th and 7th centuries BC as part of a significant movement of the nomadic peoples of the Eurasian Steppe. This movement started when another nomadic Iranian tribe closely related to the Scythians, either the Massagetae or the Issedones, migrated westwards, forcing the Early Scythians to the west across the Araxes river, following which the Scythians moved into the Caspian Steppe, where they conquered the territory of the Cimmerians, who were also a nomadic Iranian people closely related to the Scythians, and assimilated most of them while displacing the rest, before settling in the area between the Araxes, the Caucasus Mountains and the Lake Maeotis.

During this early migratory period, some groups of Scythians settled in Ciscaucasia and the foothills of the Caucasus Mountains to the east of the Kuban river, where they settled among the native populations of this region, and did not migrate to the south into West Asia.

Under Scythian pressure, the displaced Cimmerians migrated to the south along the coast of the Black Sea and reached Anatolia, and the Scythians in turn later expanded to the south, following the coast of the Caspian Sea and arrived in the steppes in Ciscaucasia, from where they expanded into the region of present-day Azerbaijan, where they settled and turned eastern Transcaucasia into their centre of operations in West Asia until the early 6th century BC, with this presence in West Asia being an extension of the Scythian kingdom of the steppes. During this period, the Scythian kings' headquarters were located in the Ciscaucasian steppes, and contact with the civilisation of West Asia would have an important influence on the formation of Scythian culture.

Arrival in the Pontic steppe
From their base in the Caucasian Steppe, during the period of the 8th to 7th centuries BC itself, the Scythians conquered the Pontic Steppe to the north of the Black Sea up to the Danube river, which formed the western boundary of Scythian territory onwards, although the Scythians may also have had access to the Wallachian and Moldavian plains. This expansion displaced another nomadic Iranian people related to the Scythians, the Agathyrsi, who were the oldest Iranian population to have dominated the Pontic Steppe, and who were pushed westwards by the Scythians, away from the steppes and from their original home around Lake Maeotis, after which the relations between the two populations remained hostile. Within the Pontic steppe, some of the Scythian tribes intermarried with the already present native sedentary Thracian populations to form new tribes such as the Nomadic Scythians and the Alazones.

Several smaller groups were likely also displaced by the Scythian expansion.

Using the Pontic steppe as their base, the Scythians over the course of the 7th to 6th centuries BC often raided into the adjacent regions, with Central Europe being a frequent target of their raids, and Scythian incursions reaching Podolia, Transylvania, and the Hungarian Plain, due to which, beginning in this period, new objects, including weapons and horse-equipment, originating from the steppes and remains associated with the early Scythians started appearing within Central Europe, especially in the Thracian and Hungarian plains, and in the regions corresponding to present-day Bessarabia, Transylvania, Hungary, and Slovakia, from the end of the 7th century onwards. Multiple fortified settlements of the Lusatian culture were destroyed by Scythian attacks during this period, with the Scythian onslaught causing the destruction of the Lusatian culture itself. Attacks by the Scythians were directed at southern Germania, and, from there, until as far as Gaul and even the Iberian Peninsula; these activities of the Scythians were not unlike those of the Huns and the Avars during the Migration Period and of the Mongols in the mediaeval era, and they were recorded in Etruscan bronze figurines depicting mounted Scythian archers as well as in Scythian influences in Celtic art.

As part of the Scythians' expansion into Europe, one section of the Scythian Sindi tribe migrated during the 7th to 6th centuries BC from the region of the Lake Maeotis towards the west, through Transylvania into the eastern Pannonian basin, where they settled alongside the Sigynnae and soon lost contact with the Scythians of the Pontic steppe. Another section of the Sindi established themselves on the Taman peninsula, where they formed a ruling class over the indigenous Maeotians, the latter of whom were of native Caucasian origin.

West Asia

In West Asia, the Scythians would go on to ally with the superpower of the region, the Neo-Assyrian Empire, when their king Bartatua married the Assyrian princess Serua-eterat.

Bartatua was succeeded by his son with Serua-eterat, Madyes, who in 653 BC invaded the Medes, thus starting a period which Herodotus of Halicarnassus called the "Scythian rule over Asia," after which he expanded the Scythian hegemony to the states of Mannae and Urartu, and entered Anatolia and defeated the Cimmerians. Scythian power in West Asia thus reached its peak under Madyes, with the territories ruled by the Scythians extending from the Halys river in Anatolia in the west to the Caspian Sea and the eastern borders of Media in the east, and from Transcaucasia in the north to the northern borders of the Neo-Assyrian Empire in the south.

By the 620s BC, the Assyrian Empire began unravelling, and in 625 BC the Median king Cyaxares overthrew the Scythian yoke over the Medes by assassinating the Scythian leaders, including Madyes.

The Scythians were finally expelled from West Asia by the Medes in the 600s BC, after which they retreated to the Pontic Steppe. Some splinter Scythian groups nevertheless remained in West Asia and settled in Transcaucasia, who by the middle of the 6th century BC had completely assimilated culturally and politically into Median society and no longer existed as a distinct group.

Pontic Scythian kingdom

Early phase
After their expulsion from West Asia, and beginning in the later 7th and lasting throughout much of the 6th century BC, the majority of the Scythians migrated from Ciscaucasia into the Pontic Steppe, which became the centre of Scythian power. Although Herodotus of Halicarnassus claimed that the Scythians retreated into the northern Pontic region through Crimea, archaeological evidence instead suggests that the Royal Scythians migrated northwards into western Ciscaucasia, and from there into the country of those Scythians who had previously established themselves in the Pontic steppe. Some of the Scythian groups who had settled in the eastern Pontic steppe to the east of the Dnipro river were displaced by the arrival of the Royal Scythians from West Asia, and they moved north into the region of the forest-steppe zone, where they constituted the tribe of the Androphagi.

During this early phase of the Pontic Scythian kingdom, the hold of the Royal Scythians on the western part of the steppe located to the west of the Dnieper was light, and they were largely satisfied with the tribute they levied on the sedentary agriculturist population of the region, while the tribe of the Aroteres, which consisted of a settled Thracian population over which ruled an Iranic Scythian ruling class, imported Greek pottery, jewellery and weapons in exchange of agricultural products, and in turn offered them in tribute to their Scythian overlords, although the country of the Alazones tribe appears to have become poorer during this time, in the early 6th century BC, when many of the rebuilt pre-Scythian settlements in their territory were destroyed by the Royal Scythians arriving from West Asia. In Crimea, the Royal Scythians took over most of the territory up to the Cimmerian Bosporus in the east. In western Ciscaucasia, where the Scythians were not large in number enough to spread throughout the region, they instead took over the steppe to the south of the Kuban river's middle course, where they reared large herds of horses. During this period, the tribe of the Royal Scythians would primarily bury their dead at the edges of the territories they occupied, especially in the western Cisaucasian region, instead of within the steppe region that was the centre of their kingdom; due to this, several Scythian kurgan  were located in Ciscaucasia, with some of them being significantly wealthy and belonging to aristocrats or royalty, and the Royal Scythians' burials in the Kuban Steppe were the most lavish of all Scythian funerary monuments during the Early Scythian period.  During the early 6th century BC, the some groups of Transcaucasian Scythians migrating northwards would arrive into the Pontic Steppe to reinforce the Royal Scythians who had already arrived there.

Between 650 and 625 BC, the Pontic Scythians came into contact with the Greeks, who were starting to create colonies in the areas under Scythian rule, including on the island of Borysthenes, near Taganrog on Lake Maeotis, as well as more places, including Panticapaeum, Pontic Olbia, and Phanagoria and Hermonassa on the Taman peninsula; the Greeks carried out thriving commercial ties with the sedentary peoples of the forest steppe who lived to the north of the Scythians, with the large rivers of eastern Europe which flowed into the Black Sea forming the main access routes to these northern markets. This process put the Scythians into permanent contact with the Greeks, and the relations between the latter and the Greek colonies remained peaceful, although the Scythians might have destroyed Panticapaeum at some point in the middle of the 6th century BC. The territory around Pontic Olbia was under the direct rule of that city and was inhabited only by Greeks.

During this period, the Scythians were ruled by a succession of kings whose names were recorded by Herodotus of Halicarnassus:
 Spargapeithes
 Lykos, son of Spargapeithes
 Gnouros, son of Lykos
 Saulios, son of Gnouros
 Idanthyrsus, son of Saulios

At the time of Idanthyrsus, and possibly later, the Scythians were ruled by three kings, with Scopasis and Taxacis ruling alongside him.

The Persian invasion

In 513 BC, the king Darius I of the Persian Achaemenid Empire, which had succeeded the Median, Lydian, Egyptian, and Neo-Babylonian empires which the Scythians had once interacted with, carried out a campaign against the Pontic Scythians, for unclear reasons. Darius's invasion was resisted by the Scythian king Idanthyrsus, who led the combined forces of the Scythians and their neighbouring peoples, and by the kings Skōpasis and Taxakis, with the Scythians refused to fight an open battle against the well-organised Achaemenid army, and instead resorting to partisan warfare and goading the Persian army deep into Scythian territory. The Persian army might have crossed the Don river and reached the territory of the Sauromatians, were Darius built fortifications, but resumed their pursuit when the Scythian forces returned.

Early decline
Over the course of the late 6th century BC, the Scythians had progressively lost their territories in the Kuban region to another nomadic Iranian people, the Sauromatians, beginning with the territory to the east of the Laba river, and then the whole Kuban territory. By the end of the 6th century BC, the Scythians had lost their territories in the Kuban Steppe and had been forced to retreat into the Pontic Steppe, except for its westernmost part which included the Taman peninsula, where the Scythian Sindi tribe formed a ruling class over the native Maeotians, due to which this country was named Sindica. By the 5th century BC, Sindica was the only place in the Caucasus where the Scythian culture survived.

Expansion
After losing their territories in the Kuban Steppe in the late 6th century BC, the Scythians had being forced to retreat into the Pontic Steppe, and the Royal Scythians' centre of power within Scythia shifted to the south, in the region of the bend of the Dnipro, where the site of Kamianka became the principal industrial centre of Scythia, with the sedentary population of the city being largely metal-workers who smelted bog iron ores into iron that was made into tools, simple ornaments and weapons for the agricultural population of the Dnipro valley and of other regions of Scythia, and the city itself was the most prominent supplier of iron and bronze products to the nomadic Scythians; the city of Kamianka also became the capital of the Scythian kings, whose headquarters were located in the further fortified acropolis of the city. At the same time, a wave of Sauromatian nomads from the lower Volga steppe in the east immigrated into Scythia over the course of 550 and 500 BC and were absorbed by the Pontic Scythians with whom they mingled. A large number of settlements in the valleys of the steppe rivers being destroyed as a result of these various migratory movements. The retreat of the Scythians from the Kuban Steppe and the arrival of the Sauromatian immigrants into the Pontic steppe over the course of the late 6th to early 5th centuries BC caused significant material changes in the Scythian culture soon after the Persian campaign which are not attributable to a normal evolution of it, resulting in the sudden appearance within the lower Dnipro region of a fully formed Scythian culture with no local forerunners, and which  included a notable increase in the number of Scythian funerary monuments.

The Scythians underwent tribal unification and political consolidation in reaction to the Persian invasion, and they also became more active and aggressive around this time, possibly as a result of the arrival of these new nomadic elements, or out of necessity to resist Persian expansionism. This change manifested itself through the consolidation of the dominant position of the Royal Scythians over the other tribes within Scythia and through the Royal Scythians' hold on the western part of their realm to the west of the Dnipro, where lived the agriculturist populations, becoming heavier and more oppressive. Another result of the changes within Scythia during this period was increased Scythian expansionism: one of the target areas of Scythian expansionism was Thrace, where the Scythians seem to have established a permanent presence to the south of the Danube at an early point, with the Greek cities of Kallatis and Dionysupolis in the area corresponding to the present-day Dobruja both being surrounded by Scythian territory; and, in 496 or 495 BC, the Scythians raided the Thracian territories far to the south of the Danube till the Thracian Chersonese on the Hellespont, as an attempt to secure themselves from Persian encroachment. The emergence of the Thracian Odrysian kingdom during the 5th century BC soon blocked the Scythian advances in Thrace, and the Scythians established friendly contacts with the Odrysians, with the Danube river being set as the common border between the two kingdoms, and a daughter of the Odrysian founder king Tērēs I marrying the Scythian king Ariapeithes; these friendly relations also saw the Scythians and Thracians adopting aspects of each other's art and lifestyles.

Names of kings who ruled over the Scythians the 5th century BC are known, although it is unknown whether these kings were ruling only the western regions of Scythia located between the Danube and Pontic Olbia or over all the Scythians:
 Ariapeithes
 Scyles, the son of Ariapeithes by a Greek woman from Histria
 Octamasadas, the son of Ariapeithes by the daughter of the Thracian Odrysian king Teres I. Octamasadas deposed Scyles and replaced him on the throne

In the north and north-west, Scythian expansionism manifested itself through the destruction of the fortified settlements of the forest steppe and the subjugation of its population.

Although the relations between the Scythians and the Greek cities of the northern Pontic region had until then been largely peaceful and the cities previously had no defensive walls and possessed unfortified rural settlements in the area, new hostile relations developed between these two parties, and during the 490s BC fortifications were built in many Pontic Greek cities, whose  were abandoned or destroyed, while burials of men killed by Scythian-type arrowheads appeared in their nekropoleis. Between 450 and 400 BC, Kerkinitis was paying tribute to the Scythians. The Scythians were eventually able to successfully impose their rule over the Greek colonies in the north-western Pontic shores and in western Crimea, including Niconium, Tyras, Pontic Olbia, and Kerkinitis.

The hold of the Scythians over the western part of the Pontic region thus became firmer during the 5th century BC, with the Scythian king Scyles having a residence in the Greek city of Pontic Olbia which he would visit each year, while the city itself experienced a significant influx of Scythian inhabitants during this period, and the presence of coins of Scyles issued at Niconium in the Dnister valley attesting of his control over this latter city. This, in turn, allowed the Scythians to participate in indirect relations with the city of Athens in Greece proper, which had established contacts in Crimea. The destruction of the Greek cities'  and rural settlements however also meant that they lost their grain-producing hinterlands, with the result being that the Scythians instituted an economic policy under their control whereby the sedentary peoples of the forest steppe to their north became the primary producers of grain, which was then transported through the Southern Buh and Dnipro rivers to the Greek cities to their south such as Tyras, Niconium and Pontic Olbia, from where the cities exported it to mainland Greece at a profit for themselves.

The Scythians were less successful at conquering the Greek cities in the region of the Cimmerian Bosporus, where, although they were initially able to take over Nymphaeum, the other cities built or strengthened city walls, banded together into an alliance under the leadership of Panticapaeum, and successfully defended themselves, after which they united into the Bosporan Kingdom.

After Scyles, coins minted in Pontic Olbia were minted in the name of Eminakos, who was either a governor of the city for Scyles's brother and successor, Octamasadas, or a successor of Octamasadas. Scythian control of the Greek cities ended sometime between 425 and 400 BC, and the cities started reconstituting their , and Pontic Olbia regained control over the territory it occupied during the Archaic period and expanded it, while Tyras and Niconium also restored their hinterlands. The Scythians lost control of Nymphaeum, which became part of the Bosporan Kingdom which itself had been expanding its territories in the Asian side of the Cimmerian Bosporus. With the arrival of a new wave of Sauromatian immigrants, the Royal Scythians and their allied tribes moved to the western parts of Scythia and expanded into the areas to the south of the Danube corresponding to modern Bessarabia and Bulgaria, and they established themselves in the Dobruja region. One of the Scythian kings who ruled during the later 5th century BC was buried in a sumptuously furnished kurgan located at Agighiol during the early 4th century BC.

Golden Age

The Scythian kingdom of the Pontic steppe reached its peak in the 4th century BC, at the same time when the Greek cities of the coast were prospering, and the relations between the two were mostly peaceful; some Scythians had already started becoming sedentary farmers and building fortified and unfortified settlements around the lower reaches of the Dnipro river since the late 5th century BC, and this process intensified throughout the 4th century BC, with the nomadic Scythians settling in multiple villages in the left bank of the Dnister estuary and in small settlements on the lower banks of the Dnipro and of the small steppe rivers which were favourable for agriculture; at the same time, there was high demand for the Greek colonies' products such as trade goods, grain, slaves, and fish, due to which the relations between the Pontic and Aegean regions, and most especially with Athens, were thriving; the importation of Greek products by the forest steppe peoples had instead decreased since the 5th century BC, and the Scythians captured territories from them in the area around what is presently Boryspil during this time. Although the Greek cities of the coast extended their territories considerably, this did not infringe on the Scythians, who still possessed abundant pastures and whose settlements were still thriving, with archaeological evidence suggesting that the population of Crimea, most of whom were Scythians, during this time increased by 600%.

The rule of the Spartocid dynasty in the Bosporan Kingdom was also favourable for the Scythians under the rules of Leukon I, Spartocus II and Paerisades I, with Leucon employing Scythians in his army, and the Bosporan nobility had contacts with the Scythians, which might have included matrimonial relations between Scythian and Bosporan royalty. In the 4th century BC, the Bosporan kingdom became the main supplier of grains to Greece partly because of the Peloponnesian War which was raging in the latter region, which intensified the grains trade between the Scythians and the Greeks, with the Scythians becoming the principal middlemen in the supply of grains to the Bosporan kingdom: while most of the grains that the Scythians sold to the Greeks was produced by the agricultural populations in the northern forest steppe, the Scythians themselves were also trying to produce more grains within Scythia itself, which was a driving force behind the sedentarisation of many of the hitherto nomadic Scythians; the process of Scythian sedentarisation thus was most intense in the regions adjacent to the Bosporan cities in eastern Crimea.

The Scythian royalty and aristocracy obtained enormous profits from this grains trade, and this period saw Scythian culture not only thriving, with most known Scythian monuments dating from then, but also rapidly undergoing significant Hellenisation. The main burial centre of the Scythians during this period was located in the Nikopol and Zaporizhzhia region on the lower Dnipro, where were located the Solokha, Krasnokutsk and  kurgans. Despite the pressure of some smaller and isolated Sarmatian groups in the east, the period remained largely and unusually peaceful and the Scythian hegemony in the Pontic steppe remained undisturbed, with the Scythian nomads continuing to form the bulk of the northern Pontic region's population.

The most famous Scythian king of the 4th century BC was Ateas, who was the successor and possibly the son of the Scythian king buried at Agighiol, and whose rule started around the 360s BC. By this period, Scythian tribes had already settled permanently on the lands to the south of the Danube, where the people of Ateas lived with their families and their livestock, and possibly in Ludogorie as well, and at this time both Crimea and the Dobruja region started being called "Little Scythia". Although Ateas had united the Scythian tribes under his rule into a rudimentary state and he still ruled over the traditional territories of the Scythian kingdom of the Pontic steppe until at least Crimea, around 350 BC he had also permanently seized some of the lands on the right bank of the Danube from the Thracian Getae, and it appears that he was largely based in the region to the south of the Danube. Under Ateas, the Greek cities to the south of the Danube had also come under Scythian hegemony, including Kallatis, over which he held control and where he probably issued his coins; further attesting of the power that the Scythians held to the south of the Danube in his time, Ateas's main activities which were centred in Thrace and south-west Scythia, such as his wars against the Thracian Triballi and the Dacian Histriani and his threat of conquest against Byzantium, which might be another possible location for where Ateas minted his coins. Ateas initially allied with Philip II of Macedonia, but eventually this alliance fell apart and war broke out between Scythia and Macedonia over the course of 340 to 339 BC, ending with the death of Ateas, at about 90 years old, and the capture of the Scythians' camp and the 20,000 women and children and more than 2,000 pedigree horses living there.

The Scythians appear to have lost some territories on both sides of the Danube due to Ateas's defeat and death, with the Getae moving to the north across the Danube and settling in the lands between the Dnipro and the Prut rivers, although. These changes did not affect Scythian power: the Scythians still continued to nomadise and bury their dead in rich kurgans in the areas to the north-west of the Black Sea between the Dnipro and the Prut; the Scythian capital of the Kamianka site continued to exist as prosperously and extensively as it had before the defeat of Ateas; and the Scythian aristocracy continued burying their dead in barrow tombs which were as sumptuous as those of Ateas's time. In 331 or 330 BC, the Scythians were able to defeat an invasion force of 30,000 men led against them and the Getae by Alexander III's lieutenant Zopyrion and which had managed to attain and besiege Pontic Olbia, with Zopyrion himself getting killed.

Decline and end
During the end of the 4th century BC, the Scythians were militarily defeated by a king of Macedonia again, this time by Lysimachus in and 313 BC. After this, the Scythians experienced another military defeat when their king Agaros participated in the Bosporan Civil War in 309 BC on the side of Satyros II, son of Paerisades I. After Satyros II was defeated and killed, his son Paerisades fled to Agaros's realm.

The aftermath of the Scythian conflict with Macedon also coincided with climatic changes and economic crises caused by overgrazed pastures, producing an unfavorable period for the Scythians, and, following their setbacks against the Macedonians, the Scythians came under pressure from the Celts, the Thracian Getae and the Germanic Bastarnae from the west; at this same time, beginning in the late 4th century BC, another related nomadic Iranian people, the Sarmatians, whose smaller, moved from the east into the Pontic steppe, where their more active groups overwhelmed the more numerous, sedentary Scythians, took over the Scythians' pastures. This deprived the Scythins of their most important resource, causing the collapse of Scythian power and as a consequence Scythian culture suddenly disappeared from the north of the Pontic sea in the early 3rd century BC. During the 3rd century BC the Celts and Bastarnae displaced the Balkan Scythians. The Protogenes inscription, written sometime between 220 and 200 BC, records that the Scythians and the Sarmatian Thisamatae and Saudaratae tribes sought shelter from the allied forces of the Celts and the Germanic Sciri. As the result of the Sarmatian, Getic, Celtic, and Germanic encroachments, the Scythian kingdom came to an end and the Scythian kurgans disappeared from the Pontic region, replaced as the dominant power of the Pontic steppe by the Sarmatians, while "" (European Sarmatia) replaced "" as the name for the region.

Little Scythia

By then, these Scythians were no longer nomadic: they had become sedentary farmers and were Hellenised, and the only places where the Scythians could still be found by the 2nd century BC were in the s of Crimea and Dobruja, as well as in the lower reaches of the Dnipro river.

In Crimea
In Crimea, the Scythians ruled over a limited a territory which included the steppes and footholls until Taurida, the lower Dnipro, and the lower Southern Buh rivers. Although the Crimean Scythians had been able to preserve some of their nomadic lifestyle, by the 3rd century BC they becoming more and more sedentary, especially in the lower Dnipro area, and were intermarrying with the Tauri of the Crimean mountains.

In the middle of the 2nd century BC, the Crimean Scythians founded a new kingdom whose rulers titled themselves , and with Scythian Neapolis as its capital and the centre of the Scythian aristocracy. The Late Scythian culture of this Crimean Scythian kingdom was not a continuation of the Scythian culture of the 4th century BC, and the kingdom itself was significantly Hellenised and more closely resembled the Hellenistic kingdoms ruled by Barbarian dynasties than to the previous nomadic kingdom of the 4th century BC Scythians.

During the 2nd century BC, the Scythians underwent further sedentarisation and formed a complete network of fortified towns and settlements, and Crimean  became largely agricultural, although royalty and the aristocracy still remained nomadic. According to written records, there were two more towns in addition to Neapolis in the Crimean , namely Chabum and Palacum; and three Crimean Scythian towns in addition to Neapolis and ten earthworks and fifty small settlements have been archaeologically identified.

The Crimean Scythian kingdom had close relations with the Bosporan kingdom, and matrimonial ties linked their respective royal houses, with the Bosporan queen Kamasarye, who was the widow of Paerisades III, taking one Argotos from Scythian Neapolis as her second husband.

The 2nd century BC was also the time when the Crimean Scythian kingdom reached its peak, and its kings, especially Skilurus attempted to obtain greater revenue by attacking the Greek cities in Crimea to evince them from their position as commercial intermediaries in the trade with the Mediterranean. Therefore, the Crimean  started expanding against the Greek cities of western Crimea which had been so far been controlled by the city of Chersonesus, whose settlements were destroyed and replaced by Scythian fortresses, and which had lost all its possessions not in its immediate vicinity by the middle of the century, with Kalos Limēn and Kerkinitis being defeated and passing under Scythian control; Pontic Olbia also became a subject of Crimean Scythia, with Skiluris minting there and establishing close ties between it and Scythian Neapolis. Thus, Skilurus ruled over all of central, western and northwestern Crimea save for Chersonesus as well as over a significant section of the north-west of the Pontic region, including Pontic Olbia, where he issued his coins. The Crimean Scythian kingdom also acquired a fleet of its own under Skilurus, thanks to which the Scythian traders were able to independently transport their agricultural products to Mediterranean markets. Although Skilurus continued Scythian hostility against Chersonesus, he maintained good ties with the Bosporan kingdom, with a daughter of his marrying a member of its royal dynasty who was named Hērakleidēs.

The Crimean Scythians continued participating in the political conflicts on the Bosporan kingdom until Chersonesus requested the assistance of the Pontic Kingdom. Diophantus, the general of the Pontic king Mithridates VI Eupator, allied with Chersonesus and defeated the Crimean Scythian king, Palacus, the son of Skilurus, some time around 110 to 108 BC, after three campaigns. Diophantus captured all the Crimean Scythian fortresses, including the capital of Scythian Neapolis, thus ending the kingdom of the Crimean Scythians and annexing its territory to the Kingdom of Pontus. This intervention saved Chersonesus, although the city was never able to regain all of its territories lost to the Crimean .

The Crimean Scythian kingdom nevertheless continued to exist even after its defeat, and, following Mithridates's own defeat by the Roman Republic, the Crimean Scythians were able to regain some of their strength during the 1st century AD, and besieged Chersonesus, who asked help from Rome, and attacked the Bosporan Kingdom. In 64 AD, the Roman legate of Moesia, Tiberius Plautius Silvanus Aelianus, campaigned against the Scythians, defeated them, and installed Roman garrisons in Crimea, including in Chersonesus. By this time, the Crimean Scythians were called "Tauro-Scythians" because of the significant mingling between the Crimean Scythians and the Tauri which had been under way since the 3rd century BC.

By 50 to 150 AD, most of the Scythians had mixed with the Tauri and the Sarmatians, although the Crimean  continued to exist throughout the 2nd and early 3rd centuries AD. The Crimean Scythian kingdom finally came to an end in the 3rd century AD, when it was conquered by the Goths and other Germanic tribes who were then migrating from the north into the Pontic steppe, and who destroyed Scythian Neapolis and the other Scythian settlements in Crimea and on the lower Dnipro. The last Scythians were thus assimilated by various newcomers during the Migration Period.

In Dobruja
In Dobruja, the Scythians established themselves as a ruling class over the local Getae tribes of this region and created a kingdom ruled by Scythian kings whose territory stretched from Tyras or even Pontic Olbia in the north to Odessus in the south.

The  of the lower Danube existed until the 1st century BC, and coins are known of several of their kings, namely Tanusakos, Kanitos, Sariakos, Akrosakos, Kharaspos, and Ailios. Like the Crimean , the Scythian kingdom in the lower Danube region was destroyed by the Pontic king Mithridates VI Eupator, although its population continued to exist.

In 62 BC the lower Danube Scythians fought a battle against the Roman general Gaius Antonius Hybrida at Histria.

By between 50 to 150 AD, most of the Scythians had been assimilated by the Sarmatians.

Extent
The territory of the Scythian kingdom of the Pontic steppe extended from the Don river in the east to the Danube river in the west, and covered the territory of the treeless steppe immediately north of the Black Sea's coastline; since the Scythian period corresponded to the period of the wet Subatlantic climatic age, the climate in the northern Pontic region was more humid than the modern period. Consequently Scythia was a damp and foggy region, and the northern limits of the steppe were further to the south than its present-day boundary.

In these favourable climatic conditions grass grew abundantly on the treeless steppe and permitted the nomadic Scythians to rear large herds of cattle and horses. The country which the Greeks named , consisting of the region of the lower Dnieper river along the territory of what is modern-day Kherson and the valleys further north along the river, was covered with forests. Conditions in the southern lands near the shores of the Black Sea were propitious for agriculture.

Little Scythia

Dobruja
In Dobruja, the Scythian kingdom's territory stretched from Tyras or even Pontic Olbia in the north to Odessus in the south.

Crimea
The later Crimean Scythian kingdom covered a limited a territory which included the steppes and footholls of Crimea until Taurida, the lower Dnieper, and the lower Southern Bug rivers.

Society

Population
The population of Scythia consisted, in addition to the Scythians themselves, of Greeks living in colonies on the northern shore of the Black Sea, and of Thracians who had inhabited the region since the Bronze Age.

The Scythians were composed of a number of tribal units, including:
The Royal Scythians were the main Scythian tribe, and they were the ruling tribe of the whole of Scythia.
 the name  corresponds to the Young Avestan name , meaning “placed at the front.”
 the name  is the Greek form of the Scythian endonym , formed by the addition of the plural suffix  to the Scythian endonym 
 the Scythian Nomads, who nomadised to the west of the Royal Scythians, between the Inhul and the bend of the Dnipro, were a mixed Thracian and Iranic Scythian tribe.
The  might have been of mixed Thracian and Iranic origins.
These Aroteres were sedentary agriculturists over whom had ruled an Iranian ruling class since the second half of the 2nd millennium BC.
 the Callipidae were a population of Thracian origin who lived across a wide section of land adjacent to the shores of the Black sea ranging from the estuary of the Southern Buh river to the area of modern-day Odesa or even until the estuary of the Dnister.
The Scythian Agriculturalists lived in the valley of the lower Dnipro river.

The neighbours of Scythia included:
 the Melanchlaeni and the Androphagi, who lived to the east of the middle Dnipro river, in the forest steppe bordering the territory of the Royal Scythians to the north. These populations were either of Scythic or of mixed Scythic and native origin.
 the Sauromatians, who lived to the east of the Scythians, in the steppe between the Don and the Volga, were another Scythic people. They were the immediate neighbours of the Royal Scythians to the east, across the Volga.
 the Neuri, who were a Baltic population of the region of the forest steppe corresponding to modern-day Belarus.
 the Budini, to the east of the Neuroi, were one of the many Finno-Ugric populations living in the eastern forest steppe until the Ural Mountains.
 the Maeotians lived on the eastern coast of Lake Maeotis.
 the Tauri lived in the Crimean Mountains.

Scythian kings
The Scythians were monarchical and were ruled by tribal kings who held absolute power over their respective tribes, and in turn owed allegiance to the king of the Royal Scythians. Royal power among the Scythians was considered as having been divinely ordained; this conception of royal power, which is well documented in the ritual symbols depicted on Mid-Scythian toreutics, was initially foreign to Scythian culture and originated in West Asia during the period of Scythian presence there in the 7th century BC.

According to the Scythologists Askold Ivantchik and Mikhail Bukharin, the Scythians had been ruled by at least three dynasties, including that of Bartatua, that of Spargapeithes, and that of Ariapeithes. The historian and anthropologist Anatoly Khazanov instead suggested that the Scythians had been ruled by the same dynasty from the time of their stay in West Asia until the end of their kingdom in the Pontic steppe.

Crafts
The centre of early Scythian industry was located in the region of the Tiasmyn group of the Scythian culture, which corresponded the country of the Aroteres, where an Iranic Scythian elite ruled over a sedentary Thracian population; the Scythians also obtained simple tools and ornamentations and some weapon types from the sedentary Thracians who lived in their kingdom, and who manufactured products such as pottery, woodwork, and weaving, as well as bronze metal-working made out of raw materials imported from Transylvania. By the Mid-Scythian period, its principal centre was at a site corresponding to present-day Kamianka-Dniprovska, where bog iron ores were smelted to produce iron, and various tools, ornaments, and weapons were made.

Trade

An important trade route existed in Scythia during the Early Scythian period which started in Pontic Olbia and followed the course of the Inhul river and crossed the Dnipro, after which it turned east until the country of the Gelonians and, after crossing the Don and the Volga, passed through the Ural Mountains and continued into Asia. Gold was traded from eastern Eurasia until Pontic Olbia through this route, and the Scythian trade went to the distant regions on its course to carry out commerce. The conquest of the north Pontic region by the Scythians and their imposition of a "" created the conditions of safety for traders which enabled the establishment of this route.

As a consequence of these flourishing trade relations, which were themselves possibly only thanks to the protection and cooperation of the Scythian kings, the Greek colonies on the northern shores of the Black Sea rapidly grew during the 6th century BC, and the Scythian upper classes were also able to significantly enrich themselves.

The relations between the Scythians and the Greek cities became more hostile during the 5th century BC, with the former destroying the latter's  and rural settlements and therefore their grain-producing hinterlands, with the result being that the Scythians instituted an economic policy under their control whereby the sedentary peoples of the forest steppe to their north became the primary producers of grain, which was then transported through the Southern Buh and Dnipro rivers to the Greek cities to their south such as Tyras, Niconium and Pontic Olbia, from where the cities exported it to mainland Greece at a profit for themselves. This arrangement came to an end sometime between 425 and 400 BC, with the Greek cities regaining their independence and rebuilding their .

Another consequence of trade between the Greeks and the Scythians was that Greek art significantly influenced Scythian art and artistic preferences, and by the Mid-Scythian period most of the artwork in the Scythian tombs consisted of Scythian motifs and scenes representing Scythian life which had been done by Greek artisans.

List of rulers

Kings of Pontic Scythians
 Spargapeithes
 Lykos
 Gnouros
 Saulios
 Idanthyrsus, ruled 
 Ariantas
 Ariapeithes, ruled 
 Scyles, ruled 
 Octamasadas, ruled 
 Ateas, ruled -339 BC
 Agaros, ruled

Kings of Crimean Scythians
 Skilurus, reigned 
 Palacus, reigned

Kings of Danubian Scythians
 Tanusakos, reigned 
 Kanitos, reigned 
 Sariakos, reigned 
 Akrosakos, reigned 
 Kharaspos, reigned 
 Ailios, reigned

Genealogy of the kings of Scythia

Family tree of Spargapeithes

Family tree of Ariapeithes

References

Sources

 
 

 
 
 
 
 
 
 

Classical antiquity
Scythians
History of Crimea
History of Dobruja